Eberhard Ludwig Cäsar Fritsch (born 21 November 1921 in Buenos Aires, Argentina; died 25 November 1974 in Salzburg, Austria) was the editor and publisher of the pro-National Socialist monthly magazine in Argentina Der Weg (The Way) (founded 1947) which advocated a revival of National Socialism in Germany after the Second World War. He was a confidant of Adolf Eichmann in Argentina before Eichmann's capture and transfer for trial to Israel. With Willem Sassen he taped Eichmann's reminiscences with a view to publishing his memoirs. The memoirs were never published but the tapes were later used at Eichmann's trial.

References

External links 
The Naumann Circle The Study of a Technique in Political Subersion

Argentine publishers (people)
German magazine editors
1974 deaths
1921 births
German magazine founders